The retrovisceral space is divided into the retropharyngeal space and the danger space by the alar fascia. It is of particular clinical importance because it is a main route by which oropharyngeal infections can spread into the mediastinum.

Some sources say the retrovisceral space is the same as the retropharyngeal space.

Other sources say that the retrovisceral space is "continuous superiorly" with the retropharyngeal space.

References

External links
 Thoracoscopic drainage with wound edge protector for descending necrotizing mediastinitis
 http://iris3.med.tufts.edu/headneck/spaces.htm

Human head and neck